The Battle of Klyastitsy, also called Battle of Yakubovo, was a series of military engagements that took place on 30-31 July 1812 and 1 August 1812 near the village of Klyastitsy (Drissa uyezd, Vitebsk guberniya) on the road between Polotsk and Sebezh. In this battle the Russian corps under the command of Peter Wittgenstein stood up to the French corps under the command of Marshal Nicolas Oudinot with heavy losses on both sides. The result was a minor Russian victory, their forces managing to capture the disputed village of Klyastitsy. The French partially retreated along their communication lines after the battle, and fended off Russian pursuers.

The battle 
On 29 July 12 French cavalry squadrons were surprised and attacked by eight Russian Hussar and Cossack squadrons under Gen. Yakov Kulnev.

At that time Oudinot occupied the village of Klyastitsy on his advance towards St. Petersburg. There were 28,000 French troops, while the Russian Corps numbered 17,000. In spite of being outnumbered, Wittgenstein decided to fight. The battle started on 30 July at 2:00 pm. The Russian vanguard led by Kulnev (approximately 4,000 men) fought the French vanguard for the whole day near the village of Yakubov (Якубово). Kulnev managed to press the French but they kept the village under their control.

The next day, after several attacks and counterattacks, the Russian advance forced Oudinot to retreat to Klyastitsy. In order to continue their advance, the Russian troops had to cross the River Nishcha. Oudinot ordered his troops to set fire to the only bridge. While the Russian cavalry was wading across the Nishcha, the 2nd Battalion of the Pavlovsk Grenadier Regiment rushed the burning bridge. This was depicted by Peter Hess in his painting, illustrated to the right.

Kulnev continued to chase the French Corps with several cavalry regiments and one infantry battalion. After crossing the Drissa River on 1 August, his unit ran into an ambush and suffered heavy casualties from French artillery. Kulnev was badly wounded (he had both his legs severed by a cannonball) and died that same day. Oudinot retreated to Polotsk and the French advance on St. Petersburg failed.

Aftermath 
Wittgenstein was awarded the Order of St. George of the Second Degree. Alexander I is reported to have called him "the savior of St. Petersburg". Capt. Krylov, whose unit was the first to cross the river over the burning bridge, received the Order of St. George of the Fourth Degree.

See also
List of battles of the French invasion of Russia

Notes

References

External links
 Battle of Klyastitsy
 

Battles of the French invasion of Russia
Battles of the Napoleonic Wars
Battles involving France
Battles involving Russia
Conflicts in 1812
July 1812 events
August 1812 events
19th century in the Russian Empire
1812 in the Russian Empire
1812 in Belarus